Jenišovice is a municipality and village in Jablonec nad Nisou District in the Liberec Region of the Czech Republic. It about 1,200 inhabitants.

Administrative parts

The village of Odolenovice is an administrative part of Jenišovice.

History
The first written mention of Jenišovice is from 1143.

References

Villages in Jablonec nad Nisou District